Guy M. Kratzer (March 10, 1941 – September 30, 2013) was an American politician from Pennsylvania who served as a Republican member of the Pennsylvania State Senate for the 16th district from 1983 to 1986.

Early life and education
Guy M. Kratzer was born in Pottsville, Pennsylvania to Guy and Kathryn Miller Kratzer.  He graduated from William Allen High School in Allentown, Pennsylvania in 1959.  He received a B.S. from Muhlenberg College in 1963, a B.D. from Evangelical School of Theology in 1967, a Th. M. from Princeton Theological Seminary in 1968 and a M.A. from Temple University in 1973.

Career
Kratzer served as a Republican member of the Pennsylvania State Senate for the 16th district from 1983 to 1986. In 1984, he crashed his car in Harrisburg, Pennsylvania and was arrested for driving under the influence.

Death
He died in Allentown, Pennsylvania on September 30, 2013.

References

1941 births
2013 deaths
20th-century American politicians
Republican Party Pennsylvania state senators
Politicians from Pottsville, Pennsylvania
Princeton Theological Seminary alumni
Temple University alumni
William Allen High School alumni